Neira may refer to:

People
Álvaro de Mendaña de Neira (1542–1595), Spanish navigator
César Neira Pérez (born 1979), Spanish cyclist
Hernán Neira (born 1960), Chilean writer and professor
Jairo Neira (born 1987), Chilean footballer
José Neira (born 1939), Colombian track and field athlete
Juan Neira (born 1989), Argentine footballer
Manuel Neira (born 1977), Chilean footballer
Miguel Ángel Neira (born 1952), Chilean footballer
Quique Neira (born 1973), Chilean singer

Places
Banda Neira, a settlement in the Banda Islands of Indonesia
Neira, Caldas, a town and municipality in Colombia
Neira Province, a province of the Boyacá Department in Colombia

Organizations
New England Interscholastic Rowing Association, runs a championship regatta for New England school rowing